KXLO (1230 AM) is a radio station broadcasting a country music format. Licensed to Lewistown, Montana, United States.  The station is currently owned by Kxlo Broadcast. Radio host Rick Rydell started his radio career at KXLO.

History

KXLO-AM was the creation of brothers George and Russell Bennitt, owners of the Lewistown Democrat News Newspaper and the Argus Farmer Newspaper. The Bennitts sold their newspaper interests to Ken Byerly in 1947, but retained their radio construction permit. They are credited with bringing radio to Central Montana under the banner of the Capitol Broadcast Company.

KXLO started broadcasting on a frequency of 1230 kHz, with a power of 250 watts, using a Western Electric Transmitter. Designated a “local” channel by the Federal Communications Commission, the power was increased to 1000 watts, with FCC permission, in approximately 1961. FCC rules required it be reduced at night to 250 watts. A few years later, most local stations were allowed to broadcast at 1000 watts full-time.

The ownership of the station has changed several times over the years. In 1950, the Bennitts sold the station to William G. Kelly under the name the Montana Broadcasting Company. Three years later, Marlin G. Obie of North Dakota joined Kelly, and they incorporated as Central Montana Broadcasting Incorporated. The station’s license and corporation was sold in 1958 to Asger Mikkelsen. Obie, along with Leroy Tappe and David L. Sather purchased the station, changing its corporate name to KXLO Broadcast, Incorporated. Obie and Tappe sold their interests in 1960 to Sather, William Yaeger and Lewis G. Boucher. Seven years later, Sather and Boucher bought out Yaeger’s interest.

Fred Lark, Beulah G. Lark, and Luann T. Lark, all of Boone, Iowa, purchased controlling interest in KXLO Broadcast, Incorporated in 1973. Beulah Lark’s interest reverted to the corporation following her death a year later. Boucher sold his interest to Fred Lark and Luann Lark in 1982. In February 2007, Bethany Lark and Melody Lark were brought into ownership by Luann Fortenbery (née Lark). Fred, Luann, Bethany and Melody continue their ownership and operation through 2009.

KXLO has broadcast country music since its start date in 1947. Until the early 1970s it also broadcasts a weekly classical “concert hall” program. In the 1970s the concert hall was changed to a "Beautiful Music" format Sunday mornings.

For many years, KXLO broadcast many agriculture-related programs. In 1973, Denver based farm broadcaster and Inter-Mountain Network (IMN) affiliate, Evan Slack, provided early morning “farm and ranch” coverage. Later in 1973, the Northern Ag Network (NAG), headquartered out of Billings, established a reel-to-reel taped network, and eventually a land line network. In the 1980s, Taylor Brown became owner/manager and the network changed its land-line format to satellite.

KXLO has subscribed to several other network and wire services, including: Mutual, ABC, ABC - Information, Inter-Mountain Network, United Press International News Service, and the Associated Press. KXLO utilizes specialty programs from ABC, CBS, Westwood One, and ESPN.

In October 2005, KXLO began to broadcast 24 hours a day, 7 days a week.

In 2011, an FM translator was added to the Moccasin Mountains and KXLO is now also on 106.9 FM.

External links

XLO
Radio stations established in 1961